Richard Fabián Prieto (born 25 February 1997) is a Paraguayan professional footballer who plays as a midfielder for Godoy Cruz, on loan from General Díaz.

Career

Club
Prieto's first club was General Díaz. He made his professional debut at the age of seventeen, featuring for thirty-two minutes of a 2–1 win over Rubio Ñu in the Paraguayan Primera División on 5 September 2014. Over the course of his opening five seasons, Prieto made one hundred and seven appearances in all competitions for the club whilst netting eight times; with his first goal coming in January 2016 against Sportivo Luqueño. Two years later, having played twice in the 2019 campaign, Prieto completed a loan move to Godoy Cruz of the Argentine Primera División.

International
Prieto represented Paraguay at U20 and U23. He initially appeared for the latter at the 2016 Toulon Tournament in France, prior to being selected for 2017 South American U-20 Championship; three caps came.

Career statistics
.

References

External links

1997 births
Living people
People from Caaguazú Department
Paraguayan footballers
Paraguay under-20 international footballers
Association football midfielders
Paraguayan expatriate footballers
Expatriate footballers in Argentina
Paraguayan expatriate sportspeople in Argentina
Paraguayan Primera División players
General Díaz footballers
Godoy Cruz Antonio Tomba footballers